0Q (zero Q) or 0-Q may refer to:

0Q, or 0 quarterback rating; see List of NFL quarterbacks who have posted a passer rating of zero
0Q, or Zero Q, dynamic pressure where air density becomes zero; see Max Q
Q\{0} a group of rational numbers without zero; see Glossary of group theory

See also
Q0 (disambiguation)